Wallace "Wally" Smith Broecker (November 29, 1931 – February 18, 2019) was an American geochemist. He was the Newberry Professor in the Department of Earth and Environmental Sciences at Columbia University, a scientist at Columbia's Lamont–Doherty Earth Observatory and a sustainability fellow at Arizona State University. He developed the idea of a global "conveyor belt" linking the circulation of the global ocean and made major contributions to the science of the carbon cycle and the use of chemical tracers and isotope dating in oceanography. Broecker popularized the term "global warming". He received the Crafoord Prize and the Vetlesen Prize.

Life 
Born in Chicago in 1931, he attended Wheaton College and interacted with J. Laurence Kulp, Paul Gast and Karl Turekian. At Wheaton, he met his wife Grace Carder. Broecker then transferred to Columbia University, graduating in 1953 with a B.A. and a Ph.D. in 1958. At Columbia, he worked at the Lamont Geological Observatory with W. Maurice Ewing and Walter Bucher.

In 1975, Broecker popularized the term global warming when he published a paper titled: "Climatic Change: Are we on the Brink of a Pronounced Global Warming?"; the phrase had previously appeared in a 1957 newspaper report about Roger Revelle's research.

Broecker co-wrote an account of climate science with the science journalist, Robert Kunzig. This included a discussion of the work of Broecker's Columbia colleague Klaus Lackner in capturing  from the atmosphere—which Broecker believed must play a vital role in reducing emissions and countering global warming. Broecker was described in the New York Times as a geoengineering pioneer.

Broecker had 8 children, 7 grandchildren, and 7 great-grandchildren. His wife Grace E. Broecker died in 2007. They were together for 53 years. Broecker married Elizabeth Clark in 2009. He died of congestive heart failure in New York City on February 18, 2019. Days before his death, he gave a livestreamed video message to his fellow scientists, where he said that humankind was not moving quickly enough to stop global warming and urged the scientific community to "seriously study more extreme solutions to the climate crisis."

Research 

Broecker's areas of research included Pleistocene geochronology, radiocarbon dating and chemical oceanography, including oceanic mixing based on stable and radioisotope distribution. This included research on the biogeochemical cycles of the element carbon and on the record of climate change contained in polar ice and ocean sediments.

Broecker authored more than 500 journal articles and 17 books. He is perhaps best known for his discovery of the role played by the ocean in triggering the abrupt climate changes which punctuated glacial time, in particular the development and popularization of the idea of a global "ocean conveyor" linking the circulation of the world's oceans. However, his contributions stretch far beyond the "conveyor"; his work is the foundation of carbon cycle science, and his applications of radiocarbon to paleoceanography are landmarks in the field. His work with chemical tracers in the ocean is integral to modern chemical oceanography; indeed, his textbook "Tracers in the Sea", authored with Tsung-Hung Peng, is still cited in the contemporary literature 25 years after its publication.

Broecker wrote about his research, on mode changes in the thermohaline circulation: "We have clear evidence that different parts of the earth's climate system are linked in very subtle yet dramatic ways. The climate system has jumped from one mode of operation to another in the past. We are trying to understand how the earth's climate system is engineered, so we can understand what it takes to trigger mode switches. Until we do, we cannot make good predictions about future climate change."

Fellowships and awards 
Broecker was a Fellow of the American Academy of Arts and Sciences and the National Academy of Sciences, Foreign Member of the Royal Society, a resident member of the American Philosophical Society, and a Fellow of the American Geophysical Union and European Geophysical Union. He received the A.G. Huntsman Award for Excellence in the Marine Sciences from the Royal Society of Canada in 1985, the Crafoord Prize in Geoscience, the National Medal of Science in 1996, Maurice W. Ewing Medal of the American Geophysical Union, the Alexander Agassiz Medal of the National Academy of Sciences, the Urey Medal of the European Association of Geochemistry, the V. M. Goldschmidt Award from the Geochemical Society, the Vetlesen Prize from the G. Unger Vetlesen Foundation, the Wollaston Medal of the Geological Society of London, the Roger Revelle Medal of the American Geophysical Union, the Tyler Prize for Environmental Achievement from the University of Southern California, the Blue Planet Prize from The Asahi Glass Foundation, the 2008 Benjamin Franklin Medal in Earth and Environmental Science  from The Franklin Institute in Philadelphia, Pennsylvania, and the 2008 BBVA Foundation Frontiers of Knowledge Award in Climate Change.

In 2008 Broecker was the recipient of the Balzan Prize for outstanding achievement in science. His citation was made by Enric Banda (Research Professor of Geophysics at the Institute of Earth Sciences in Barcelona):

In 2009, Broecker was awarded the BBVA Foundation Frontiers of Knowledge Award in the Climate Change category for his research into the world's oceans, pioneering "the development of Earth System Science as the basis for understanding global climate change, both past and present". The award certificate also highlights "his holistic approach", which has led him to identify "the mechanisms of abrupt climate change".

Broecker received honorary doctorates from Cambridge University, Oxford University, Pennsylvania State University, Harvard University, and Southern Methodist University, among others. On May 28, 2015, he was awarded an honorary doctorate by Harvard University.

Selected books

See also 
Carbon dioxide removal#Artificial trees
List of geophysicists

References

External links 
 Glaciers That Speak in Tongues and other tales of global warming, by Wallace S. Broecker
 Interview with Wally Broecker, August 31, 2008
 Oral History interview transcript with Wallace S. Broecker on 29 December 1995, American Institute of Physics, Niels Bohr Library & Archives - Session I
 Oral History interview transcript with Wallace S. Broecker on 8 May 1997, American Institute of Physics, Niels Bohr Library & Archives - Session II
 Oral History interview transcript with Wallace S. Broecker on 6 June 1997, American Institute of Physics, Niels Bohr Library & Archives - Session III
 Oral History interview transcript with Wallace S. Broecker on 14 November 1997, American Institute of Physics, Niels Bohr Library & Archives - Session I
 Oral History interview transcript with Wallace S. Broecker on 21 December 1997, American Institute of Physics, Niels Bohr Library & Archives - II
 Canadian Broadcast Corporation audio interview with Wallace S. Broecker 21 April, 1975, CBC Archives
 BBVA Foundation Frontiers of Knowledge Awards

1931 births
2019 deaths
Scientists from Chicago
Writers from Chicago
American geophysicists
National Medal of Science laureates
American geochemists
American oceanographers
Brentwood High School (Brentwood, New York) alumni
Columbia University faculty
Lamont–Doherty Earth Observatory people
Wollaston Medal winners
Members of the United States National Academy of Sciences
Foreign Members of the Royal Society
Fellows of the American Geophysical Union
Recipients of the V. M. Goldschmidt Award
Columbia College (New York) alumni
Columbia Graduate School of Arts and Sciences alumni
Presidents of the Geochemical Society